Steven Gätjen (born 25 September 1972 in Phoenix, Arizona) is a German-American event and TV host based in Germany.

Gätjen speaks fluent German and English. He hosts TV programs and live events and also works as an actor and producer. Since 2004, he owns a restaurant in New York called Via Monterone. From 1999 to 2015, he was employed by ProSieben. On 19 December 2015, he left ProSieben after the last Schlag den Raab episode. In February 2016, he started in his new role at ZDF.

Film and television

Television 

"Top 10 TV" (weekly prime time show, August 2005 to June 2006) – host, Kabel 1
"Werbung! Das Beste aus aller Welt" (weekly, since July 2005) – host, Kabel 1
"Disney Filmparade" (weekly kids show, since April 2004) – host, Pro7
"Soundcheck" (weekly music show, since March 2004) – host, Hit24 (Premiere)
"E! News Live" (daily entertainment news show, 2002–2003) – host and segment producer, E!
"Der Maulwurf (The Mole)" (adventure game show, 2002) – host, Pro7
"Speed – Time is Money" (quiz show, 2002) – host, Pro7
"Fort Boyard" (adventure game show, 2001–2002) – host, Pro7
"Champions Day" (prime time family game show, 2001) – host, Sat.1
"Oscar Red Carpet Show" (2000–2002) – host, Pro7
"taff" (daily entertainment and news show, live, 1999–2001) – host, Pro7
"taff extra" (weekly entertainment and news show, 1999) – host, Pro7
"MTV Europe News" (daily music news show, 1996–1999) – host and producer, MTV
"MTV News Highlights" (weekly music news show, 1996–1999) – host and producer, MTV
"Schlag den Raab" (game show,  2011–2015) – host, Pro7
"Unser Star für Baku" (casting show,  2012) – host, Pro7, Das Erste
"Joko und Klaas gegen ProSieben" (game show, 2019) – host, Pro7
"Sorry für alles" (game show, since August 2019) – host, ZDF
"Joko und Klaas gegen ProSieben" (game show, 2020) – host,  Pro7
"5 Gold Rings" (game show, 2020) - host, Sat.1

Voice-over work 
 2016: Zootopia (news-speaker in the German version)
 2017: Ferdinand (animal control worker in the German version)
 2018: Spies in Disguise  (as Lance Sterling in the German version)

Filmography 
"Inga Lindström – Sterne über dem Liljesund" – (ZDF, 2005)
"The Relic Hunter – The Reel Thing" – (Pro 7, 2000)
"Klinikum Berlin Mitte" – (Sat.1, Pro 7, 2000)
"Spezialistenshow" – (ZDF, 2000)

Radio
"Morning Show" – (1996) OK Radio
"Nightflight" – (1994–1996) OK Radio
"Movies" – (1994–1996) OK Radio

References

External links
Official website
ICM Beverly Hills – Agency / U.S.
POOL POSITION Management GmbH – Agency / Europe
Schauspieleragentur Stefanie Gäbel – Actor's Agency
Via Monterone – Gätjen's restaurant in New York City

1972 births
Living people
Television personalities from Phoenix, Arizona
American game show hosts
American people of German descent
ZDF people
ProSieben people